Peter Brunette (September 18, 1943 – June 16, 2010) was a film critic and film historian. He was the author of several books, including biographies of Italian directors Roberto Rossellini and Michelangelo Antonioni. Brunette’s last book was about Austrian director Michael Haneke, published in February 2010.

Selected bibliography
(co-author) Screen/Play: Derrida and Film Theory (with David Wills), Princeton, 1989).
(co-editor) Deconstruction and the Visual Arts (with David Wills, Cambridge, 1994)

Notes

Further reading

1943 births
2010 deaths
People from Richwood, West Virginia
American film historians
American film critics
The Hollywood Reporter people
Duquesne University alumni
University of Wisconsin–Madison alumni
Journalists from West Virginia
Writers from West Virginia
American biographers
American male biographers